Space Launch Complex 8 (SLC-8), is a launch pad at Vandenberg Space Force Base in California, United States. It is used by Minotaur rockets. It was originally part of the California Spaceport, and was known as the Commercial Launch Facility (CLF) or Space Launch Facility (SLF).

As of August 2011, nine rockets; six Minotaur I and three Minotaur IV, have been launched from SLC-8.

Rocket configuration

References

 

Vandenberg Space Force Base